Sthandiwe Kgoroge (born Sithandiwe Msomi; 4 February 1972) is a South Africa actor who appeared in Generations, series 5 and 7 of MTV Shuga, the mini-series MTV Shuga Alone Together, and the first series of Yizo Yizo.

Life
Kgoroge lived in Edmonton, Canada, from age five to ten. She was educated at the University of Natal, where she graduated in drama. She has said that she struggled with her self image, but eventually realised that her dark complexion was exactly right.

She appeared in the first series of Yizo Yizo as Zoe Cele in 1999. She was recognised as the best supporting actress in a drama series for this role, and she received an Avanti Award. She played twins in Generations from 1999 to 2005.

She appeared in series 5 of MTV Shuga as Aunt Nomalenga and returned to the role for the mini-series MTV Shuga Alone Together, which highlighted the problems of the COVID-19 pandemic, on 20 April 2020. During the series the characters talk to each other about life during the lockdown. The mini-series is scheduled for 60 nights and its backers include the "Every Woman Every Child". The series is based in Nigeria, South Africa, Kenya and Cote D’Ivoire. All of the filming is done by the actors themselves, who include Lerato Walaza, Mamarumo Marokane and Mohau Cele.

Private life
Kgoroge is married to actor Tony Kgoroge, and they have children. When faced with debt recovery in 2018, he asked that people ignore his and his wife's Instagram pages, saying they were only "ordinary citizens". He was facing a loss of earnings because he was not being paid for repeat fees by some broadcasters.

References 

Living people
South African television actresses
University of Natal alumni
1972 births
20th-century South African actresses